Crown Lynn was a New Zealand ceramics manufacturer that operated under various names between 1854 and 1989.

Early history

The pottery's origins started with an 1854 land purchase at Hobsonville, near Auckland, by Rice Owen Clark. He had arrived in New Zealand thirteen years before and had previously worked as a school teacher in Wellington and as a clerk in Auckland. To drain his land, he made his own pipes by wrapping logs with clay and firing them with charcoal. This first production led to his making pipes for his neighbours, and by the 1860s he had a thriving pipeworks. His success encouraged a number of others to form similar small companies. In 1929 the various small producers merged to become the Amalgamated Brick and Pipe Company.

Clark's plant moved from Hobsonville to New Lynn, Auckland, in 1925. New Lynn offered better clay, more access to workers and a rail siding close by.

Tom Clark, one of Rice Owen Clark's great-grandsons, began working in the firm during the 1930s depression. He was responsible for the plant expanding in 1937 to produce items unrelated to the building trade such as electrical insulation equipment and moulds for rubber products such as gloves, baby bottle teats and condoms. Clark was an employer who always encouraged his staff to experiment with new products. As a result, an oil-fired continuous tunnel kiln was built in 1941, and tableware manufacture began the following year. The company had established a research department in 1938 to investigate the viability of producing tableware from New Zealand clays.

Government supply

After the outbreak of World War II in 1939, only essential goods were imported into New Zealand, and by December 1940 no imported crockery was available in the country. Under a directive from the wartime Ministry of Supply, the company produced thousands of coffee mugs and plates for the American forces stationed in New Zealand and the Pacific Islands, as well as tableware for New Zealand military and domestic use.

One and a half million cups were made in the financial year from April 1943 to March 1944. Those early cups had a significant flaw: the handles broke off easily. However, the year's production reports said that "the quality of the articles is steadily increasing". This type of utilitarian tableware became central to Crown Lynn, and the company gained a reputation for supplying sturdy and reliable products. This reputation culminated when the company was also contracted to supply the New Zealand Railways Department with tableware, and ultimately the Crown Lynn Railways cup and saucer became a twentieth-century icon in the country.

The Crown Lynn lines of military and Railways crockery were highly successful. However, because there was no crockery imported into New Zealand, the range had to be extended to suit the domestic market. A tunnel kiln was built in 1941, and the following year a new range of tableware was produced including pudding basins, casserole dishes and various sized chamber pots. However, due to shortages of material and labour, the decorations were simple. Alongside this extended range, the Railways cups and saucers continued to be produced in bulk. Clark continued to be innovative, founding a laboratory to test clay samples and a variety of other scientific tasks.

Diversification of designs
After the war, the company began to experiment and diversify. Employees were encouraged to develop different styles. Artist Dave Jenkin came from the Elam School of Art in 1945, and later helped in setting up the design studio. With guidance from his aunt, Briar Gardner, he began by applying glaze effects to ornamental wares, and a trickle glaze technique was developed. These trickle-glazed pieces are still highly sought after by collectors. In 1948, the "specials" department of Amalgamated Brick and Pipe became Crown Lynn Potteries Limited.

In the late 1940s and early 1950s Tom Clark recruited experienced staff from England and Europe to work in the newly formed Crown Lynn Specials Department. New equipment was purchased which enabled a more extensive range to be developed. This new range included tea sets, art pottery and salad ware, and utilised a variety of decorative techniques such as monogram printing, band brushing and lining. At the same time the factory laboratory discovered that the use of a halloysitic clay from Matauri Bay helped increased the fired whiteness of the body. This enabled Crown Lynn to mass-produce tableware decorated with transfers, and coloured tableware. This discovery virtually saved the firm, as the recent revaluation of the pound had made it very difficult for companies to export overseas. The intent of the "Specials Department" was to produce more upmarket works from Crown Lynn's existing commercial production-line wares in order to compete with the Royal Doulton works that were being imported into New Zealand. Tom Clark hired, among others, Frank Carpay, Mirek Smisek and Ernest Shufflebotham.

In 1961 the purchase of a Malkin pattern stamp machine and a Murray Curvex colour printing machine enabled the company to produce variations of popular overseas patterns. "These machines bring pottery decoration to as near automation as is presently practical," said production manager Colin Leitch. "With only one operation on the machine itself, plus those engaged in bringing up and removing the ware, the Murray Curvex will put through 200 dozen pieces a day. The Malkin will do even better - 400 or more."

At the time Crown Lynn was the southern hemisphere's largest producer of household pottery, and remained so up to at least 1978. At its height the factory employed 650 staff, produced about 17 million pieces annually, and exported to Australia, the Pacific Islands, south-east Asia, the USA and Canada.

Brands used by Crown Lynn 
Crown Lynn used several difference brands over the years it was in production, as demonstrated by the wide variety of backstamps seen today. Some of the more common include:
 Ascot (sold at McKenzies)
 Avondale Selection (named after Avondale Raceway)
 Brereton Ware (exclusive to D.I.C - named after their head buyer Jack Brereton)
 Colourglaze
 Contemporary Ceramics
 Essentials Quality Homewares
 Fancy Fayre 
 Goldline
 Genuine Ironstone
 Handwerk
 Lynndale (a portmanteau of New Lynn and Avondale)
 Kelston British / Potteries / Ceramics / Ferrostone (named after the Auckland suburb of Kelston, adjacent to New Lynn)
 Ngakura
 Roydon (exclusive to McKenzies & named after McKenzies founding brothers Roy and Don)
 Titian Studio (Titian Pottery was bought in 1969-71)
 Wentworth Ware
 Wharetana

As well as the above, many pieces are unmarked save for variations of "New Zealand", "Made in New Zealand" or "Made in NZ" either stamped or pressed into the base.

Expansion and change to Ceramco
As Crown Lynn grew, they also either purchased or partnered a number of other companies: 
 1965 - Crown Lynn purchased Christchurch-based pottery Luke Adams. A number of Crown Lynn shapes were subsequently made in Christchurch for several years until the factorys close in 1975.  
 1968 - Crown Lynn purchased Gibsons & Paterson, which was established in NZ in 1909 and opened in Australia in 1913. Ceramco continued to hold shares in the company after Crown Lynn was shut down until Ceramco's liquidation in 2001. 
 1969 - Crown Lynn purchased a significant shareholding in Titian Potteries, purchasing the remaining shares in 1971. 
 1971 - Crown Lynn purchased Royal Grafton in the UK, manufacturers of fine bone china. This continued to run separately and did not manufacture Crown Lynn shapes. Royal Grafton was sold in 1985 in a management buyout. 
 1972 - Crown Lynn entered into a partnership in the Philippines called Mayon Ceramics. Some output carried the Crown Lynn name or other trademarks (such as Ironstone). In addition, some patters from New Zealand were also produced there, in addition to entirely new lines (such as Ligaya and Luzon). Crown Lynn exited the partnership in 1982.

In 1974 Crown Lynn changed its corporate name to Ceramco and continued to diversify into a series of new interests, including electronics, appliance wholesaling and making acquisitions including Bendon lingerie. The pottery itself continued under the Crown Lynn name.

Closure of NZ operations
Ceramco announced the Crown Lynn factory closure on 5 May 1989. By then staff numbers had fallen to between 180 and 220, and many amongst the largely female workforce believed that the Government had sabotaged the company by allowing cheap imported tableware into the country. Crown Lynn's share of New Zealand's domestic tableware market was then less than 20% in value, despite the company's successful move from the lower end of the market to a more middle ground.

Ceramco blamed the closure in part on union inflexibility in a pre-Labour market reform economy. Although Crown Lynn was showing signs of recovery after years of trading losses, the company could not compete with the more advanced manufacturing technologies used in Asia and Europe. In September 1989 all of Crown Lynn's assets, including plant, designs and brand name, were sold to GBH Porcelain Sdn Bhd of Malaysia.

Preservation and museum 
Shortly after the closure of Crown Lynn, Paul Hemara and Richard Quinn helped preserve much of the important history of Crown Lynn, including salvaging from the factory pottery, documentation, moulds and machinery. In 1996, a series of collaborative projects commenced with "Crown Lynn New Zealand' - A Salvage Operation" that was exhibited at the High Street Project Gallery in Christchurch and the City Gallery in Wellington.

In 2011, there were two exhibitions on Crown Lynn collections: Crown Lynn: Crockery of Distinction at City Gallery Wellington and Crown Lynn: Pottery for the People at Gus Fisher Gallery.

Te Toi Uku, the Crown Lynn and Clayworks Museum, is managed by the Portage Ceramics Trust.

References

External links

 
 Te Toi Uku - the Crown Lynn museum
 Online gallery of Crown Lynn pottery
 Crown Lynn pottery in the collection of the Museum of New Zealand Te Papa Pongarewa
 Crown Lynn pottery in the collection of the Auckland War Memorial Museum Tāmaki Penga Hira
 New Zealand Railways Cup and Saucer; Te Papa Tai Awatea | Knowledge Net

Defunct companies of New Zealand
Manufacturing companies based in Auckland
Ceramics manufacturers of New Zealand
New Zealand design
West Auckland, New Zealand